Winnen of Leren (English: 'Winning or Learning') is the autobiography of Dutch author and mental health activist Noa Pothoven, which was published in November 2018.

Background 
Winnen of Leren was published when Pothoven was 16 years old and criticised youth mental health care in her country, won a prize for non-fiction and made her well-known. The book contains Pothoven's diaries concerning her hospitalisations for PTSD as a result of rape, and covers her struggle with depression, self-harm, anorexia and wish to have euthanasia.

Reception 
The book became controversial following Pothoven's death in June 2019, which was wrongfully attributed by foreign media to active euthanasia.

References

Autobiographies
Psychology-related autobiographies
2018 in women's history
Works about mental health